was a Japanese photographer.

References

Japanese photographers
1882 births
1944 deaths